Madan Chauhan is an Indian politician and a member of the 16th Legislative Assembly of Uttar Pradesh of India. He formerly represented the Garhmukteshwar constituency of Uttar Pradesh and is a member of the Samajwadi Party political party. In 2022, he joined Bahujan Samaj Party (BSP).

Early life and education
Madan Chauhan was born in Meerut. He attended the Chaudhary Charan Singh University and attained Bachelor of Commerce degree.

Political career
Madan Chauhan has been an MLA for three straight terms. He represented the Garhmukteshwar constituency and is a member of the Samajwadi Party political party. He was state minister of entertainment department. He was in charge (prabhari) of Lalitpur district, Lalitpur. In 2022 Assembly Elections, he has been fielded by Bahujan Samaj Party (BSP) from Garhmukteshwar constituency.

Posts held

See also
Garhmukteshwar
Sixteenth Legislative Assembly of Uttar Pradesh
Uttar Pradesh Legislative Assembly

References 

Samajwadi Party politicians
Uttar Pradesh MLAs 2002–2007
Uttar Pradesh MLAs 2007–2012
Uttar Pradesh MLAs 2012–2017
People from Gautam Buddh Nagar district
Chaudhary Charan Singh University alumni
1956 births
Living people